The following are the appointments to various Canadian Honours of 2019. Usually, they are announced as part of the New Year and Canada Day celebrations and are published within the Canada Gazette during year. This follows the custom set out within the United Kingdom which publishes its appoints of various British Honours for New Year's and for monarch's official birthday. However, instead of the midyear appointments announced on Victoria Day, the official birthday of the Canadian Monarch, this custom has been transferred with the celebration of Canadian Confederation and the creation of the Order of Canada.

However, as the Canada Gazette publishes appointment to various orders, decorations and medal, either Canadian or from Commonwealth and foreign states, this article will reference all Canadians so honoured during the 2019 calendar year.

Provincial Honours are not listed within the Canada Gazette, however they are listed within the various publications of each provincial government. Provincial honours are listed within the page.

The Order of Canada

Companions of the Order of Canada

 James Arthur, C.C.
 Geoffrey E. Hinton, C.C.
 Iain Baxter, C.C., O.Ont., O.B.C. - This is a promotion within the Order
 Robert Phelan Langlands, C.C.
 Alanis Obomsawin, C.C., G.O.Q. - This is a promotion within the Order
 Buffy Sainte-Marie, C.C. - This is a promotion within the Order
 Donald McNichol Sutherland, C.C. - This is a promotion within the Order
 James Francis Cameron, C.C.
 Raymond A. J. Chrétien, C.C.  - This is a promotion within the Order
 George A. Cohon, C.C., O.Ont.  - This is a promotion within the Order
 The Right Honourable Stephen Joseph Harper, P.C., C.C.
 Donna Theo Strickland, C.C.

Honorary Officer of the Order of Canada

 Marie Ann Battiste, O.C.

Officers of the Order of Canada
 Jo-ann Archibald Q’um Q’um Xiiem, O.C.
 Vernon Douglas Burrows, O.C. - This is a promotion within the Order
 Leonard Joseph Cariou, O.C., O.M.
 Levente László Diosady, O.C., O.Ont.
 Digvir Jayas, O.C.
 Suzanne Lacasse, O.C.
 Robert Lacroix, O.C., O.Q. - This is a promotion within the Order
 Daniel Lamarre, O.C.
 Leroy Little Bear, O.C., A.O.E.
 Ann-Marie MacDonald, O.C.
 Christopher Newton, O.C. - This is a promotion within the Order
 Jean Pelletier, O.C.
 Rebecca Scott, O.C., M.S.M.
 Robert Tessier, O.C.
 Richard Ernest Tremblay, O.C.
 Ric Esther Bienstock, O.C.
 Ronnie Burkett, O.C.
 Elizabeth Cannon, O.C.
 Gordon R. Diamond, O.C., O.B.C.
 John England, O.C.
 Graham Fraser, O.C.
 Rémy Girard, O.C.
 Eldon C. Godfrey, O.C.
 Moya Marguerite Greene, O.C.
 Lisa LaFlamme, O.C., O.Ont.
 Marion Lewis, O.C.
 James A. O’Reilly, O.C.
 Arthur J. Ray, O.C.
 Lotfollah Shafai, O.C.
 Martin Hayter Short, O.C. - This is a promotion within the Order
 Peter Suedfeld, O.C.
 Brian Sykes, O.C.
 William G. Tholl, O.C.
 Harvey D. Voldeng, O.C.
 Ian E. Wilson, O.C. - This is a promotion within the Order
 John Amagoalik, O.C., O.Nu.
 Annette av Paul, O.C.
 Raymond Bachand, O.C.
 David Osborn Braley, O.C.
 Eddy Carmack, O.C.
 John J. Clague, O.C.
 Slava Corn, O.C.
 Jean-Charles Coutu, O.C., O.Q.
Donald B. Dingwell, O.C.
 Michael Donovan, O.C.
 Alain-G. Gagnon, O.C.
 The Honourable Daniel P. Hays, P.C., O.C., C.D.
 Mark Henkelman, O.C.
 Joan May Hollobon, O.C.
 Daniel Jutras, O.C.
 Shoo Kim Lee, O.C.
 Thomas E. H. Lee, O.C.
 Noni MacDonald, O.C., O.N.S.
 Robie W. Macdonald, O.C.
 Robin McLeod, O.C.
 André Ménard, O.C.
 Karen Messing, O.C.
 Christine M. Morrissey, O.C.
 Sister Sue M. Mosteller, O.C.
 Donald Kenneth Newman, O.C.- This is a promotion within the Order
 Caroline Ouellette, O.C.
 François Paulette, O.C.
 Debra Pepler, O.C.
 Heather Maxine Reisman, O.C.- This is a promotion within the Order
 Cheryl Rockman-Greenberg, O.C., O.M.
 Marcel Sabourin, O.C.
 James V. Scott, O.C.
 Alain Simard, O.C., C.Q.
 Gilles Ste-Croix, O.C.
 Josef Svoboda, O.C.
 Lorna Wanósts'a7 Williams, O.C., O.B.C.
 James V. Zidek, O.C.
 Bernard Zinman, O.C. - This is a promotion within the Order

Honorary Members of the Order of Canada

 Kathleen Reichs, C.M.
 Richard J. Schmeelk, C.M., C.Q.

Members of the Order of Canada

 Eva Aariak, C.M.
 Brent Belzberg, C.M.
 Hélène Boisjoly, C.M.
 Barbara M. Bowlby, C.M.
 Doneta A. P. Brotchie, C.M.
 Shelley Ann Marie Brown, C.M
 John M. Brunton, C.M.
 Shirley Cheechoo, C.M.
 Robert Crosbie, C.M.
 Joanne Cuthbertson, C.M.
 Kevin J. Dancey, C.M.
 Michel de la Chenelière, C.M., C.Q.
 Raymond L. Desjardins, C.M.
 Thomas Dignan, C.M., O.Ont.
 Ian Robert Dohoo, C.M.
 Lyse Doucet, C.M., O.B.E.
 Micheline Dumont, C.M.
 Jean André Élie, C.M.
 Darren Entwistle, C.M.
 Ann McCain Evans, C.M.
 Roxanne Fairweather, C.M., O.N.B.
 Ross D. Feldman, C.M.
 Charles Edgar Fipke, C.M.
 Charles Fischer, C.M.
 Léopold L. Foulem, C.M.
 Ron Foxcroft, C.M.
 The Honourable John Ferguson Godfrey, P.C., C.M.
 Georges Henri Goguen, C.M.
 Blake Charles Goldring, C.M., M.S.M, C.D.
 Serge Gouin, C.M.
 Jean Grand-Maître, C.M.
 Daniel Granger, C.M.
 Gordon Cecil Gray, C.M., O.Ont.
Arshavir Gundjian,C.M.
 Alfred Halasa, C.M.
 Linda Hasenfratz, C.M.
 Jay Hennick, C.M.
 Michael Higgins, C.M.
 Paul John Higgins, C.M.
 Robert Hindmarch, C.M., O.B.C.
 Robert Hung-Ngai Ho, C.M., O.B.C.
 John Kirk Howard, C.M.
 Austin Hillard Hunt, C.M.
 Barbara Jackman, C.M.
 Christina Jennings, C.M.
 Alexandra F. Johnston, C.M.
 Bengt Jörgen, C.M.
 Roger Kerans, C.M.
 Robert Korneluk, C.M.
 Mary R. L’Abbé, C.M.
 Gilbert Laporte, C.M.
 Donald Gordon Lawson, C.M.
 Daniel Lessard, C.M.
 The Honourable H. Frank Lewis, C.M., O.P.E.I.
 James Lockyer, C.M.
 Gloria Macarenko, C.M.
 John McEwen, C.M.
 Jefferson Mooney, C.M.
 Raymond Alexander Muzyka, C.M.
 Maxine Noel, C.M.
 Francis Pang, C.M.
 Kathleen Pearson, C.M.
 Isabelle Peretz, C.M., O.Q.
 Andrew Petter, C.M.
 Marshall S. Pynkoski, C.M.
 Imant Karlis Raminsh, C.M.
 Dominique Rankin, C.M., C.Q.
 John Rea, C.M.
 Michèle Rivet, C.M.
 Henri-Paul Rousseau, C.M.
 Claudine Roy, C.M., C.Q.
 Louis Sabourin, C.M., C.Q.
 André Simard, C.M.
 Peter D. Simons, C.M., C.Q.
 Pekka Sinervo, C.M.
 Arthur Slutsky, C.M.
 Heather Stuart, C.M.
 Camille Henri Thériault, C.M.
 Charles Maral Tisseyre, C.M.
 Denis Vaugeois, C.M., O.Q.
 Elisabeth Walker-Young, C.M.
 Rhoda Wurtele Eaves, C.M.
 Rhona Wurtele Gillis, C.M.
 Gregory Zeschuk, C.M.
 Jeannette Regula Lajeunesse Zingg, C.M.
 Renée April, C.M.
 Luigi Aquilini, C.M., O.B.C.
 Renaldo Battista, C.M.
 W. J. Brad Bennett, C.M., O.B.C.
 Susan Benson, C.M.
 Louise Bradley, C.M.
 Joseph Raymond Buncic, C.M.
 Robert L. Carroll, C.M.
 Raymond J. Cole, C.M.
 Patrick Ralph Crawford, C.M.
 Aubrey Dan, C.M.
 Fernand Dansereau, C.M.
 Tom Ralston Denton, C.M., O.M., C.D.
 Claire Deschênes, C.M.
 Sara Diamond, C.M., O.Ont.
 Michel Dumont, C.M., O.Q.
 Edna Ekhivalak Elias, C.M., O.Nu.
 Mitch Garber, C.M.
 H. Roger Garland, C.M.
 Frank Giustra, C.M.
 Mark Byron Godden, C.M.
 Chan Hon Goh, C.M.
 Jean-Paul Grappe, C.M., C.Q.
 V. Tony Hauser, C.M.
 Eric Garth Hudson, C.M.
 Andy Jones, C.M.
 Gertrude Kearns, C.M.
 Perry R. W. Kendall, C.M., O.B.C.
 Keith I. Knott, C.M.
 Paul C. LaBarge, C.M.
 Suzanne Labarge, C.M.
 Reginald Leach, C.M., O.M.
 Walter J. Learning, C.M., O.N.B.
 Keith MacPhail, C.M.
 Bennett McCarty, C.M.
 David McLean, C.M.
 The Honourable Joseph Robert Nuss, C.M., Q.C.
 C. Michael O’Brian, C.M.
 Hanna Maria Pappius, C.M.
 Linda Rabin, C.M.
 Claude Raymond, C.M.
 Chaim M. Roifman, C.M.
 Nick Saul, C.M.
 Donald R. M. Schmitt, C.M.
 Brenda Harris Singer, C.M.
 Donna M. Slaight, C.M.
 John Warren Sleeman, C.M.
 A. Britton Smith, C.M.
 Dorothy E. Smith, C.M.
 Michael Dixon Smith, C.M.
 Howard Timothy Lee Soon, C.M.
 J. David Spence, C.M.
 Matthew Teitelbaum, C.M.
 James W. Treliving, C.M.
 The Honourable Allan H. Wachowich, C.M., A.O.E., Q.C.
 John Wade, C.M.
 The Honourable Karen Merle Weiler, C.M.
 Pita Aatami, C.M., C.Q.
 Brian Ahern, C.M.
 Mathew Baldwin, C.M.
 T. Robert Beamish, C.M.
 Ronald Duncan Besse, C.M.
 Paul Born, C.M.
 Maurice Brisson, C.M.
 Omer Chouinard, C.M.
 Diane Clement, C.M.
 Mitchell Cohen, C.M.
 John Collins, C.M.
 The Honourable James Cowan, C.M., Q.C.
 Phillip Crawley, C.M., C.B.E.
 Valerie Lynn Creighton, C.M., S.O.M.
 Anne Innis Dagg, C.M.
 Mary Eberle Deacon, C.M.
 The Reverend Dr. Cheri DiNovo, C.M.
 Xavier Dolan, C.M., C.Q.
 Hugo Eppich, C.M.
 Wayne John Fairhead, C.M.
 Ronald Charles Fellows, C.M.
 Thomas J. Foran, C.M., O.N.L.
 Eric D. Friesen, C.M.
 Berna Valencia Garron, C.M.
 Myron Austin Garron, C.M.
 Hana Gartner, C.M.
 Marie Giguère, C.M.
 Katherine Govier, C.M.
 Brigadier-General the Honourable John James Grant, C.M., C.M.M., O.N.S., C.D.
 Ken Greenberg, C.M.
 Roger D. Grimes, C.M.
 Arshavir Gundjian, C.M.
 Sarah Hall, C.M.
 Pavel Hamet, C.M., O.Q.
 Peter Harrison, C.M.
 Joyce Louise Hisey, C.M.
 Gordon J. Hoffman, C.M., Q.C.
 Steve E. Hrudey, C.M., A.O.E.
 John S. Hunkin, C.M.
 Johnny Nurraq Seotaituq Issaluk, C.M.
 Peter Kendall, C.M.
 Hal Philip Klepak, C.M., C.D.
 alcides lanza, C.M.
 Cathy Levy, C.M.
 Wendy Lisogar-Cocchia, C.M., O.B.C.
 Derek Lister, C.M.
 Julie Macfarlane, C.M.
 Isabelle Marcoux, C.M.
 R. Mohan Mathur, C.M.
 Donald S. Mavinic, C.M.
 Denyse McCann, C.M.
 Séan McCann, C.M.
 Brian Theodore McGeer, C.M.
 Stuart M. McGill, C.M.
 Anthony Bernard Miller, C.M.
 Nadir H. Mohamed, C.M.
 Susan Helena Mortimer, C.M.
 M. Lee Myers, C.M.
 Paul Nicklen, C.M.
 The Honourable Donald H. Oliver, C.M., Q.C.
 Brian Stuart Osborne, C.M.
 Louis-Frédéric Paquin, C.M.
 Ralph Pentland, C.M.
 Michael U. Potter, C.M.
 Robert Dick Richmond, C.M.
 Larry Rosen, C.M.
 Janice Sanderson, C.M.
 Kourken Sarkissian, C.M.
 Duncan Gordon Sinclair, C.M.
 Harry Sheldon Swain, C.M.
 Beverly Thomson, C.M.
 Darren Dennis Throop, C.M.
 Jennifer Tory, C.M.
 Gordon W. Walker, C.M., Q.C.
 Mel Watkins, C.M.
 Sheri-D Wilson, C.M.
 Lynn Margaret Zimmer, C.M.

Order of Military Merit

Commanders of the Order of Military Merit

 Major-General Frances Jennifer Allen, C.M.M., C.D. - This is a promotion within the Order.
 Major-General Christian Drouin, C.M.M., M.S.C., C.D. - This is a promotion within the Order.
 Lieutenant-General Wayne Donald Eyre, C.M.M., M.S.C., C.D.
 Rear-Admiral Arthur Gerard McDonald, C.M.M., M.S.M., C.D.
 Major-General Carl Jean Turenne, C.M.M., M.S.C., C.D. - This is a promotion within the Order.

Officers of the Order of Military Merit

 Colonel John Joseph Alexander, O.M.M., M.S.M., C.D.
 Commodore Geneviève Bernatchez, O.M.M., C.D.
 Colonel Joseph Raoul Stéphane Boivin, O.M.M., M.S.C., C.D.
 Brigadier-General Marie Hélène Lise Bourgon, O.M.M., M.S.C., C.D.
 Colonel Pierre Frédéric André Demers, O.M.M., M.S.C., C.D.
 Brigadier-General Andrew Michael Downes, O.M.M., C.D.
 Lieutenant-Commander Valérie Bernadette Finney, O.M.M., C.D.
 Colonel William Hilton Fletcher, O.M.M., S.M.V., C.D.
 Captain(N) Michael Andrew Hopper, O.M.M., C.D.
 Major Jameel Jawaid Janjua, O.M.M., C.D.
 Colonel Jay Howard Janzen, O.M.M., C.D.
 Brigadier-General Stephen Richardson Kelsey, O.M.M., C.D.
 Lieutenant-Colonel Catherine Jocelyne Marchetti, O.M.M., C.D.
 Colonel Christopher Alan McKenna, O.M.M., M.S.M., C.D.
 Colonel Jean Georges René Melançon, O.M.M., C.D.
 Lieutenant-Colonel Kevin Reinhold Morton, O.M.M., M.S.M., C.D.
 Lieutenant-Colonel Kristopher Robert Purdy, O.M.M., C.D.
 Colonel Roger Leigh Scott, O.M.M., C.D.
 Brigadier-General Nicolas Stanton, O.M.M., C.D.
 Lieutenant-Colonel Eleanor Frances Taylor, O.M.M., M.S.M., C.D.
 Commander Michele Tessier, O.M.M., C.D.

Members of the Order of Military Merit

 Warrant Officer Charles Ansell, M.M.M., C.D.
 Warrant Officer Jason Eric Armstrong, M.M.M., C.D.
 Master Warrant Officer Hugo Serge Asselin, M.M.M., C.D.
 Master Warrant Officer James Matthew Aucoin, M.M.M., C.D.
 Chief Warrant Officer Bruce Edward Ball, M.M.M., C.D.
 Master Warrant Officer Maryse Marie Monique Bélisle, M.M.M., C.D.
 Captain Guy Beriau, M.M.M., C.D.
 Chief Warrant Officer Jean Gérard Éric Bouffard, M.M.M., C.D.
 Chief Warrant Officer Maurice George Campbell, M.M.M., C.D.
 Chief Petty Officer 1st Class Daniel Eugene Campbell, M.M.M., C.D.
 Chief Warrant Officer Joseph Stéphane Martin Cartier, M.M.M., C.D.
 Master Warrant Officer Darryl John Cattell, M.M.M., C.D.
 Captain Blair Ainlie Christie, M.M.M., C.D.
 Warrant Officer Steven Alan Corcoran, M.M.M., C.D.
 Master Warrant Officer Joseph Noël Patrick Crépeau, M.M.M., C.D.
 Captain Brougham August Robert Deegan, M.M.M., C.D.
 Master Warrant Officer Joseph Olivier Richard Descheneaux, M.M.M., C.D.
 Warrant Officer Joseph Steve Desgagné, M.M.M., M.B., C.D.
 Master Corporal Mohammed Diabei-Irani, M.M.M., M.S.M., C.D.
 Sergeant Dustin Donovan, M.M.M., C.D.
 Master Warrant Officer Robert Allen Englehart, M.M.M., C.D.
 Chief Warrant Officer Joseph Jacques Friolet, M.M.M., M.S.M., C.D.
 Warrant Officer Frédéric Joseph André Gagnon, M.M.M., C.D.
 Warrant Officer Anthony Stephen Gilmore, M.M.M., C.D.
 Chief Petty Officer 2nd Class Matthew James Goodwin, M.M.M., C.D.
 Warrant Officer Charles William Howieson Graham, M.M.M., C.D.
 Master Warrant Officer Nancy Maryse Yolande Guay, M.M.M., C.D.
 Chief Warrant Officer Robert Hains, M.M.M., C.D.
 Master Warrant Officer Joseph Sabin Serge Harvey, M.M.M., C.D.
 Petty Officer 1st Class Leanne Marjorie Hebert, M.M.M., C.D.
 Chief Petty Officer 2nd Class Michelle Florence Hopping, M.M.M., C.D.
 Sergeant Gordon Joseph Hynes, M.M.M., C.D.
 Chief Petty Officer 1st Class Joseph François Jean-Claude Sylvain Jaquemot, M.M.M., C.D.
 Ranger Linda Marie Kamenawatamin, M.M.M.
 Chief Petty Officer 2nd Class Chesley Wayne Keeping, M.M.M., C.D.
 Warrant Officer Jamie Knox, M.M.M., C.D.
 Sergeant Marie-Élaine Michèle Labrèche, M.M.M., C.D.
 Master Warrant Officer Marie Josée Guylaine Lapierre, M.M.M., C.D.
 Petty Officer 1st Class Natasha Tanya Lea Leavitt, M.M.M., C.D.
 Chief Petty Officer 1st Class Arvid Donnie Lee, M.M.M., C.D.
 Sergeant Caroline Linteau, M.M.M., C.D.
 Captain Brian John Lougheed, M.M.M., C.D.
 Major Timothy Lourie, M.M.M., C.D.
 Warrant Officer Angel Margaret MacEachern, M.M.M., M.B., C.D.
 Master Warrant Officer Jerome Patrick MacMullin, M.M.M., C.D.
 Master Warrant Officer Duane Lewis May, M.M.M., C.D.
 Master Warrant Officer Trevor Gerard McInnis, M.M.M., C.D.
 Warrant Officer Krista Lea McKeough, M.M.M., C.D.
 Chief Petty Officer 1st Class Dana Bernice McLellan, M.M.M., C.D.
 Chief Warrant Officer David Francis McNeil, M.M.M., C.D.
 Petty Officer 2nd Class Pier-Vincent Michaud, M.M.M., M.M.V., C.D.
 Lieutenant Eldon Heberling Moulton, M.M.M., C.D.
 Master Warrant Officer Sheldon David Murphy, M.M.M., C.D.
 Master Warrant Officer David Basil Myers, M.M.M., C.D.
 Chief Warrant Officer Paul Stewart Nolan, M.M.M., C.D.
 Master Warrant Officer Joseph Guy Éric Normand, M.M.M., C.D.
 Chief Petty Officer 2nd Class John Dwayne Oake, M.M.M., C.D.
 Warrant Officer Suzie Marie Paquin, M.M.M., C.D.
 Master Warrant Officer Joseph Irénée Sébastien Parent, M.M.M., C.D.
 Chief Warrant Officer Richard Plante, M.M.M., C.D.
 Warrant Officer Christian Claude Poirier, M.M.M., C.D.
 Master Warrant Officer Sarah Ann Powers, M.M.M., C.D.
 Master Warrant Officer Rodney Wade Purchase, M.M.M., C.D.
 Master Warrant Officer Daniel Robichaud, M.M.M., C.D.
 Chief Petty Officer 1st Class Stanley Jerome Ryan, M.M.M., C.D.
 Chief Petty Officer 1st Class Thomas Ernest Scott, M.M.M., C.D.
 Ranger Ronald Glenn Scott, M.M.M.
 Chief Warrant Officer Edward Patrick Smith, M.M.M., M.S.M., C.D.
 Master Warrant Officer Michael Adam Smith, M.M.M., M.S.C., C.D.
 Warrant Officer Joseph Armand Rico Smith, M.M.M., M.M.V., C.D.
 Warrant Officer Pierre Hugo St-Laurent, M.M.M., C.D.
 Master Warrant Officer Chester William Tingley, M.M.M., C.D.
 Warrant Officer Joseph Laurence Gilles Turgeon, M.M.M., C.D.
 Major Timothy Morgan Utton, M.M.M., C.D.
 Chief Warrant Officer Mark Alexander von Kalben, M.M.M., C.D.
 Master Warrant Officer Ruel Delroy Walker, M.M.M., C.D.
 Warrant Officer Casey Todd Welbourn, M.M.M., C.D.
 Sergeant Kimberly Wheatland, M.M.M., C.D.
 Lieutenant-Commander Kelly Lynne Williamson, M.M.M., C.D.
 Major Cybèle Jennifer Wilson, M.M.M., C.D.

Order of Merit of the Police Forces

Commander of the Order of Merit of the Police Forces

 Chief Jennifer Evans, C.O.M. - This is a promotion within the Order

Officers of the Order of Merit of the Police Forces

 Chief Richard M. Bourassa, O.O.M. - This is a promotion within the Order
 Deputy Chief Michael T. Callaghan, O.O.M.
 Assistant Commissioner François Deschênes, O.O.M. - This is a promotion within the Order
 Deputy Chief William (Bill) Charles Fordy, O.O.M. - This is a promotion within the Order
 Chief Kimberley Greenwood, O.O.M.
 Staff Sergeant Roy Lalonde, O.O.M.
 Special Constable Ryan Gregory Prox, O.O.M.

Members of the Order of Merit of the Police Forces

 Superintendent Alfredo Martin Bangloy, M.O.M.
 Chief Joseph Aloysius Boland, M.O.M.
 Sergeant Dwayne W. Bolen, M.O.M.
 Acting Staff Sergeant Steve Boucher, M.O.M.
 Assistant Commissioner Jasmin Breton, M.O.M.
 Superintendent John William Matthew Brewer, M.O.M.
 Sergeant Mark Christensen, M.O.M.
 Ms. Marnie Clark, M.O.M.
 Chief Gary G. Conn, M.O.M.
 Superintendent Michelle Davey, M.O.M.
 Inspector Benoit Dubé, M.O.M.
 Deputy Chief Lee Foreman, M.O.M.
 Superintendent Thomas Grant Foster, M.O.M.
 Superintendent Shawn Gill, M.O.M.
 Staff Sergeant Kurtis Wayne Grabinsky, M.O.M.
 Superintendent David L. Haye, M.O.M.
 Superintendent John Christopher Kennedy, M.O.M.
 Chief Superintendent Bruce Ian Kirkpatrick, M.O.M.
 Superintendent Ken E. Leppert, M.O.M.
 Inspector Richard Levesque, M.O.M.
 Ms. Cheryl McNeil, M.O.M.
 Inspector Sheri Lynn Meeks, M.O.M.
 Staff Sergeant Debbie Miller, M.O.M.
 Superintendent Clifford J. O’Brien, M.O.M.
 Director Robert Pigeon, M.O.M.
 Superintendent Tammy Ann Pozzobon, M.O.M.
 Constable Cynthia L. Provost, M.O.M.
 Chief Superintendent David W. Quigley, M.O.M.
 Deputy Chief James Ramer, M.O.M.
 Chief Constable Michael James Serr, M.O.M.
 Superintendent Brian W. Shalovelo, M.O.M.
 Staff Sergeant Richard D. Stewart, M.O.M.
 Assistant Commissioner Stephen N. S. Thatcher, M.O.M.
 Superintendent Rohan Kirk Thompson, M.O.M.
 Inspector Joanne Wild, M.O.M.
 Deputy Chief Roger James Wilkie, M.O.M.
 Chief Bryant E. A. Wood, M.O.M.
 Sergeant Michael R. Yanko, M.O.M.
 Superintendent Mitchell K. Yuzdepski, M.O.M.
 Assistant Commissioner Curtis Michael Zablocki, M.O.M.

Royal Victorian Order

Lieutenant of the Royal Victorian Order
 Ricki Brian Ashbee (29 December 2018)

Member of the Royal Victorian Order
 Tania Marie Carnegie (29 December 2018)

Most Venerable Order of the Hospital of St. John of Jerusalem

Knights and Dames of the Order of St. John
 Her Honour the Honourable Janet Austin
 Robert Michale Boyko
 Her Honour the Honourable Judy May Foote
 The Honourable Angélique Bernard
 John McDougall, C.D.

Commanders of the Order of St. John
 Allan Blundell Bird, C.D.
 Michael Dosdall
 John Buckingham Newman

Officers of the Order of St. John
 Romano Oseo Acconci, C.D.
 Jean Perron
 Deepak Prasad
 Major Steven Mark Daniel
 Sandra Harris
 Captain (Retired) Gary Robert Hayes, C.D.
 Sandra Lynn Ladd
 Adam Nathan Parker
 Glen William Rutland
 David Raymond Valentine, C.D., A.D.C.

Members of the Order of St. John
 Glen Elvin Bollman
 Thomas Stewart Brown
 Matthew Caindec
 Hélène Caron
 Samantha Grace Carriere
 Marc Chabot
 Jacqueline Starr Cunningham
 Richard Wallace Currie
 Robert Thomas Darlington
 Gilles Deziel
 Judith Anne Doyle
 Vera AnneMarie Dulysh
 Richard Royce Eustace
 Sergeant Beverley Fallon
 Marla Gail Feinstein
 Warrant Officer John Robert Girard, C.D.
 Janet Gay Hazen
 Lindsay Anne Jones
 Karyn Lynn Kennedy
 Kayla Dawn-Marie Leary-Pinch
 Frédéric Lemieux-Legendre
 John Macdonell
 Thomas Jung Mah
 Major (Retired) Ronald Richard Mathews, C.D.
 Warrant Officer Michael Melvin, M.M.M., C.D.
 Hélène Morneau
 Breanna Caitlyn Murphy
 Vincent Pageau
 Naval Cadet Alexander Fisher Pay
 Marc-Antoine Pigeon
 Bharat Rai
 Christine Marie Redekop
 Samantha Roman, C.D.
 William Anderson Siemens
 Ralph Smith
 Lieutenant (N) Mark Andrew Stark, C.D.
 Acting Sub-Lieutenant Dexter Sze Leung Tsui
 Petty Officer 1st Class Kevin John Van Arnhem, C.D.
 Randy Philip Warden
 Ethan Albert Whitehead
 Clare Akintoye
 Dominic Benoit
 Anik Boudreau
 Maria Man-Nga Chen
 Galynne Brooke Cini
 Maxime Demers
 Brian Richard Foley
 Jean-René Guilbault
 Heidi Christina Hanney
 Michelle Hébert
 Eun Ah Lee
 Jeff Mok
 Stacey Savage
 Captain Christopher Arthur Shewchuk, C.D.
 Major (Retired) Gino Nello Simeoni, C.D.
 Cora Jean Thomson
 John Michael Valtonen
 Robert Zeidler

Provincial Honours

National Order of Québec

Grand Officers of the National Order of Québec

 M. Phil Gold - This is a promotion within the Order 
 M. Pierre Lassonde - This is a promotion within the Order

Officers of the National Order of Québec

 M. Daniel Borsuk 
 M. Yvon Charest
 M. Fernand Grenier 
 Mme Louise Harel
 Mme Trang Hoang
 M. Paul Inchauspé (2015)
 M. Morton S. Minc
 M. Sylvain Moineau
 M. Claude Montmarquette
 M. Charles Morin
 M. Louis Vachon, CM

Honorary Knight of the National Order of Québec

 Éric-Emmanuel Schmitt

Knights of the National Order of Québec
 Mme Sharon Azrieli
 Mme Marie-Dominique Beaulieu
 M. Robert Boily
 Mme Natalie Choquette
 Mme Louise Cordeau
 Mme Micheline Dumont
 M. Laurent Duvernay-Tardif
 M. Yves Gingras
 M. François Girard
 M. Geoffrey Green
 M. Philippe Gros
 M. Jean-Pierre Léger
 M. Geoff Molson 
 M. Robert Panet-Raymond
 M. Michel Phaneuf
 M. Robert E. Prud’homme
 Mme Louise Sicuro
 M. Roland Smith
 M. Alain Trudel
 Mme Maïr Verthuy
 M. Denis Villeneuve 
 M. Florent Vollant.

Saskatchewan Order of Merit

 Don Atchison
 Doug Cuthand
 Grit McCreath
 Lyn Goldman, LL.D.
 Andy Potter, FCAHS
 William F. Ready, Q.C., B.A., J.D., LL.D.

Order of Ontario

 Last appointments in 2017.

Order of British Columbia

 David H. Brewer
 John A. Brink
 Scott McIntyre
 Dr. Judy McLean
 Murray Farmer
 Lynda Farmer
 Dr. Carl J. Walters
 Ronald L. Cliff
 The Honourable Patricia Carney
 Dr. Kimit Rai
  Susan Tatoosh
 Dr. Bruce McManus
 Tamara Vrooman
 Jane Coop
 David Kampe (posthumous)

Alberta Order of Excellence

 Robert Burrell
 Bonnie DuPont
 Katie Ohe
 Ron Sakamoto
 Beckie Scott
 Malcolm Sissons
 Muriel Stanley Venne
 Frances Wright

Order of Prince Edward Island

Jeanette Arsenault
 Leo Broderick
 Dr. Najmul H. Chishti

Order of Manitoba

 Vivian Bruce
 Marcel A. Desautels
 James Ehnes
 Kathy Hildebrand
 Arvid Loewen
 Clarence Nepinak
 Steven Schipper	
 Trudy Schroeder	
 Harvey Secter	
 Joy Smith	
 Michael West

Order of New Brunswick

 Patricia Bernard
 Héliodore Côté
 Michel Doucet
 Léo Johnson
 Lois Scott
 Robyn Tingley
 Abraham Beverley Walker
 James “Jim” Wilson
 Claire Wilt
 John Wood

Order of Nova Scotia

 Dr. Elizabeth Cromwell, C.M. (Posthumous)
 Francis Dorrington
 Dr. Noni MacDonald
 Ann MacLean
 David M. McKeage (Posthumous)

Order of Newfoundland and Labrador

 Joseph Butler
 The Honourable Richard Cashin, P.C., OC
 Paula Dawe
 Rev. Arthur G. Elliott
 Darryl Fry
 Cassandra Ivany
 Kaetlyn Osmond
 Odelle Pike
 John Christopher Pratt, CC
 Dr. Lloydetta Quaicoe

Territorial Honours

Order of Nunavut

 Peter Tapatai

Order of the Northwest Territories

 Lyda Fuller
 "Buffalo" Joe McBryan

Order of Yukon

 Doug Bell
 Ione Christensen
 Patricia Ellis
 Judy Gingell
 Percy Henry
 Gary Hewitt
 Rolf Hougen
 Dave Joe
 Sam Johnston
 Lyall Murdoch

Canadian Bravery Decorations

Star of Courage

 Constable Nicholas Crowther
 Constable Ryan Barnett
 David E. Fragoso
 Constable Josh McSweeney

Medal of Bravery

 Daniel Gilbert Arnold
 Michael Douglas Barkhouse
 Constable Rafael Beaulieu
 David Bose
 Constable Trevor Joseph Bragnola
 Petty Officer 1st Class Charles Wesley Bressette, C.D.
 Constable David Brosinsky
 Captain Bryce Carey
 Master Corporal Jesus Castillo
 Sergeant David J. Cowan
 Master Corporal Kashif Dar
 Andrew Gregory Daub
 Charlène Desrosiers
 Raymond Doucette
 Michael Allen Easton
 Daryl Eckert
 Richard William Fisk
 Michael G. Galbraith
 Branden Gertzen
 Cameron Gouck
 Timothy John Harrison
 Keegan Herries
 Hayley Hesseln
 Sergeant Andrea Karistinos, C.D.
 Sergeant Derek King
 Captain Michael Lawrence Kristy, C.D.
 Master Corporal Ryan Kristy
 Sergeant Jérémie Landry
 Petty Officer 2nd Class David Alan LeBlanc, C.D.
 Rodney Wayne McAlpine
 Robert David McDonald
 Sean James Laurimer McGuinnis
 Don McNeice
 Byron Meston
 Cole Mitchell
 Charles Pealey
 Andrew Pearson
 Richard Pick
 Quiming Qi
 Yun Qi
 Constable Adam Rayner
 Tristan Reddy
 Tyler Reddy
 Len Anthony Rice
 Gabriel Roy-Lacouture
 Chelsi Sabbe
 Thierry Sauvain
 Sean Leslie Silverthorne
 Paul Derek Snow
 Constable Ashley Steven Thompson
 Michael Tompkins
 Trevor Vanderhyden
 Michael Waldner
 Michael Went
 Constable Tyler White
 Ryan Wurtz
 Alexandre Beaudoin-Vachon
 Michel Denis Bourbonniere, M.S.M.
 Erik Richard Brown
 Marie-Soleil Côté-Lepage
 Sergeant Paul Dungey
 Sergeant Michael Fonseca
 Shachar Gabay
 Christopher Gascon
 Constable Brandon Goudey
 Constable George Hunter
 Corporal Guy Johnson
 Constable Kyle Josey
 Corporal Peter King
 Master Seaman Emmanuel Lemieux
 Frédéric Lord
 Constable Ron Lyver
 Leading Seaman Reeves Paul Anthony Matheson
 Detective Steve McCuaig
 Corporal Jean-Guy Christian Pascal Richard
 John Schuiteboer
 Connor Stanley
 Constable Timothy Stevens
 Sébastien Tousignant
 Will Wang

Meritorious Service Decorations

Second Award of the Meritorious Service Cross (Military Division)

Brigadier-General Conrad Joseph John Mialkowski, O.M.M., M.S.C., C.D.

Meritorious Service Cross (Military Division)

 Commander Sheldon Roderick Kyle Gillis, C.D.
 Corporal Alexander Nicolas Papineau-Levesque
 Brigadier-General Trevor John Cadieu, O.M.M., M.S.M., C.D.
 Sergeant Jeffery Theodore Oshanyk, C.D.
 Major-General Joseph Paul Alain Pelletier, O.M.M., M.S.M., C.D.
 Brigadier-General Steven Joseph Russel Whelan, O.M.M., M.S.M., C.D.

Meritorious Service Cross (Civil Division)

 Isseldin M. M. Abuelaish, O.Ont., M.S.C.
 Kahlil Baker, M.S.C.
 Pierre Duval, M.S.C.
 François Fassier, M.S.C.
 Gerald Mitchel Fried, M.S.C.
 Samuel Gervais, M.S.C.
 Richard Howard Gimblett, M.S.C., C.D.
 David Carl Hein, M.S.C.
 Laura Howard, M.S.C.
 Cynthia Lickers-Sage, M.S.C.
 Tobias Lütke, M.S.C.
 Alaa Mohamed Murabit, M.S.C.
 Losang Chodon Rabgey, M.S.C.
 Tsering Dolker Rabgey, M.S.C.
 Tashi Yangzom Rabgey, M.S.C.
 Pencho Rabgey, M.S.C.
 Sandra Muir Reilly, M.S.C.
 Ellen Remai, M.S.C.
 Frank Remai, M.S.C. (Posthumous)
 Michael Rubinoff, M.S.C.
 Irene Sankoff, M.S.C.
 Lisa Steele, M.S.C.
 Kim Tomczak, M.S.C.
 Sam J. Tsemberis, M.S.C.
 Brooke van Mossel-Forrester, M.S.C.
 Jean Vincent, M.S.C.

Second Award of the Meritorious Service Medal (Military Division)

 Brigadier-General David James Anderson, O.M.M., M.S.M., C.D.
 Major Michael Roy Deutsch, M.S.M., C.D.
 Colonel Mark Anthony Gasparotto, M.S.M., C.D.
 Colonel Joseph Pierre Huet, M.S.M., C.D.
 Chief Warrant Officer Michael Patrick Forest, M.M.M., M.S.M., C.D.

Meritorious Service Medal (Military Division)
 Lieutenant-Colonel George Michael Albert Boyuk, C.D.
 Commander Ramona Lynn Burke, C.D.
 Chief Petty Officer 2nd Class Randolph Shawn Byrnes, C.D.
 Warrant Officer Danny Carl Compton, C.D.
 Lieutenant-Colonel Corey Jason Frederickson, C.D.
 Commander Jacob French, C.D.
 Sergeant Nicholas Shawn Hancock, C.D.
 Captain(N) Steve Jorgensen, C.D.
 Petty Officer 1st Class Joseph Kiraly, C.D.
 Lieutenant-Colonel Erik Antony Liebert, C.D.
 Lieutenant-Commander Jason Lorette
 Lieutenant-Colonel Robert Jeffrey Lyttle, C.D.
 Major Michael MacKillop, M.M.V., C.D.
 Commander Gordon Willis Jacob Noseworthy, C.D.
 Leading Seaman Patrick James Parkhill
 Colonel Douglas Peter Pietrowski (USA)
 Lieutenant-Colonel Ryan Zane Sexsmith, C.D.
 Commander Michael Scott Shortridge, C.D.
 Captain(N) Michael James Tennant, C.D.
 Commander Michael Thomson, C.D.
 Chief Warrant Officer Thomas Kenneth Verner, M.M.M., C.D.
 Major Wayne Terence Wong, C.D.
 Colonel Joseph Antoine Dave Abboud, M.S.C., M.M.V., C.D.
 Lieutenant-Colonel Fraser George Auld, C.D.
 Sergeant Gary Barrett
 Petty Officer 1st Class Jason William Bode, C.D.
 Captain(N) Daniel Joseph Jacques Larry Bouchard, C.D.
 Warrant Officer Nicolas Robin Côté, C.D.
 Chief Warrant Officer Andrew Jack Durnford, M.M.M., C.D.
 Lieutenant-Colonel Sean Martin French, C.D.
 Lieutenant-Colonel Mark Christopher Hickey, C.D.
 Chief Petty Officer 1st Class Joseph François Jean-Claude Sylvain Jacquemot, C.D.
 Colonel Andrew Ronald Jayne, C.D.
 Major Alan Lockerby, C.D.
 Lieutenant-Colonel Mark James Lubiniecki, C.D.
 Chief Warrant Officer Robert Claude McCann, M.M.M., C.D.
 Lieutenant-Colonel Thomas Edmund Murphy, C.D.
 Colonel Donald Potoczny (U.S.A.)
 Lieutenant-Colonel Kristopher Michael Reeves, C.D.
 Major Joseph Pascal Jean David Roberge, C.D.
 Sergeant Jason Charles Toole
 Master Corporal Alexander Yu

Meritorious Service Medal (Civil Division)

 Oleh Michael Antonyshyn, M.S.M.
 Roland Barbier, M.S.M.
 Diana Christina Beaupré, M.S.M.
 Richard Bennett, M.S.M.
 Willa Black, M.S.M.
 Narcisse Tatsikiistamik Blood, M.S.M. (Posthumous)
 Caroline Bouchard, M.S.M.
 Monique A. D. Bourassa, M.S.M.
 Gabriel Bran Lopez, M.S.M.
 Sylvain Brosseau, M.S.M.
 Gregory Robert Medlock Brown, M.S.M.
 Mary Anne V. Chambers, O.Ont., M.S.M.
 Diane Chênevert, C.Q., M.S.M.
 Rachel Corneille Gravel, M.S.M.
 Norman D. Crerar, M.S.M.
 Barbara Ellen Crook, M.S.M.
 John R. Dallaire, M.S.M.
 Aldo E. J. Del Col, M.S.M.
 Gilles Desjardins, M.S.M.
 Virginia Edmonds, M.S.M.
 John Morris Fairbrother, M.S.M.
 Olivier Farmer, M.S.M.
 Lison Gagné, M.S.M.
 Brian O’Neill Gallery, M.S.M.
 Sally F. E. Goddard, M.S.M.
 Daniel George Greenberg, M.S.M.
 Israel Imoukhuede Aikodion Idonije, O.M., M.S.M.
 A. Lois Kalchman, M.S.M.
 Bob Lyle Kayseas, M.S.M.
 Catherine J. Keddy, M.S.M.
 Paul A. Keddy, M.S.M.
 Janet F. Kitz, M.S.M.
 Frank Korvemaker, M.S.M.
 Irene C. Kroeker, M.S.M.
 Rachel Lapierre, M.S.M.
 Robert E. LeBlanc, M.S.M.
 Ronald Oscar Linden, M.S.M.
 Julie E. Lohnes-Cashin, M.S.M.
 Kathryn Lorna Lucking, M.S.M.
 Morley Stuart Lymburner, M.S.M.
 Robin Mednick, M.S.M.
 Mitchell Ryan Moffit, M.S.M.
 Éric Nadeau, M.S.M.
 Monique Nolett-Ille, M.S.M.
 Patrick J. O’Brien, M.S.M.
 Morgane Louise-Marie Oger, M.S.M.
 Gradimir Pankov, M.S.M.
 Brad Richards, M.S.M.
 Joseph Michael Roberts, M.S.M.
 Marie Saint Pierre, C.M., C.Q., M.S.M.
 Habeeb H. Salloum, M.S.M.
 Amar Sangha, M.S.M.
 Beverley Tosh, M.S.M.
 Adrian Watkinson, M.S.M.
 Bev Woods-Percival, M.S.M.
 Hana Zalzal, M.S.M.

Secret appointments
 5 January 2019 : Her Excellency the Right Honourable Julie Payette, Governor General and Commander-in-Chief of Canada, on the recommendation of the Chief of the Defence Staff, has awarded a Meritorious Service Cross and a Meritorious Service Medal to members of the Canadian Armed Forces for military activities of high standard that have brought great honour to the Canadian Armed Forces and to Canada. For security and operational reasons, the recipient names and citations have not been released.
 6 July 2019: On behalf of THE QUEEN, the Governor General, on the recommendation of the Chief of the Defence Staff, has awarded a Meritorious Service Cross and a Meritorious Service Medal to members of the Canadian Armed Forces for military activities of high standard that have brought great honour to the Canadian Armed Forces and to Canada. For security and operational reasons, the recipient names and citations have not been released.

Mention in Dispatches

 Master Corporal Sean David, C.D.

Polar Medal

 Curtis L. Brown, 
 Susan Jennifer Chatwood
 John P. Smol, O.C.

Commonwealth and Foreign Orders, Decorations and Medal awarded to Canadians

From Her Majesty The Queen in Right of Barbados

Silver Crown of Merit of the Order of Barbados

 Dr. John Edward Hutson

From Her Majesty The Queen in Right of Jamaica

Prime Minister’s Medal of Appreciation for Service to Jamaica

 Mr. Desmond Emerson Edward Doran
 Ms. Claudette Yvonne Cameron Stewart

From Her Majesty The Queen of New Zealand

Member of the New Zealand Order of Merit

 Dr. Ruth Busch

From Her Majesty The Queen in Right of the United Kingdom

Member of the Order of the Companions of Honour

 Dr. Margaret Eleanor Atwood,

Commander of the Most Excellent Order of the British Empire

 Ms. Elizabeth Denham
 Dr. Corinne Le Quéré

Officer of the Most Excellent Order of the British Empire
 Ms. Nicola Mary Louise Yates
 Mr. Roger Malbert
 Ms. Janet Lynn Paterson

Member of the Most Excellent Order of the British Empire
 Ms. Lea Baroudi
 Mr. Michael James Winfield
 Mr. Alfred Smithers

British Empire Medal

 Ms. Karin Elizabeth Snape
 Mr. Kevin Timothy Routledge

From the President of the Republic of Colombia

Grand Officer of the Order of Military Merit “José María Córdova”

 Brigadier-General Stephen Lacroix

From the President of the Republic of Finland

Knight of the Order of the Lion of Finland, 1st Class

 Mr. Theodore Bossé
 Ms. Eija Peltokangas

Knight of the Order of the Lion of Finland
 Mr. Reijo Viitala

From the President of the French Republic

Commander of the National Order of the Legion of Honour

 Ms. Marie-Josée Kravis

Officer of the National Order of Merit

 Ms. Sophie d’Amours

National Medal of Recognition for victims of terrorism

 Mr. Paul Joseph Racette
 Mrs. Camille Racette Roussel
 Mr. Emerson J. Racette Roussel

Officer of the Order of Arts and Letters

 Mr. Guy Delisle
 Mr. Xavier Dolan

Commander of the Order of the Academic Palms

 Mr. Gaston Sauvé

Knight of the Order of the Academic Palms
 Mr. Allister Surette

Knight of the Order of Agricultural Merit

 Mr. Jean-Pierre Vaillancourt

Overseas Medal with Middle East Clasp
 Major Simon Brochu

National Defence Medal, Gold Echelon

 Lieutenant-Colonel Martin Arcand

National Defence Medal, Silver Echelon
 Major Jean Ferland

National Defence Medal, Bronze Echelon with Armée de terre clasp
 Colonel Jason Langelier

National Defence Medal, Bronze Echelon
 Major Nancy Guerin
 Major Francis Lavoie

From the President of the Federal Republic of Germany

Cross of the Order of Merit of the Federal Republic of Germany

 Mr. Harald Wilfred Kuckertz

From the President of Hungary

Gold Cross of Merit of the Republic of Hungary (Civil Division)
 Mr. Ferenc (Francis) Jagodits
 Mr. Stephen Willerding

From His Majesty The Emperor of Japan

Order of the Rising Sun, Gold Rays with Neck Ribbon
 Mr. Kenneth Zaifman
 Mr. Claude-Yves Charron
 Mr. Ben Ciprietti

Order of the Rising Sun, Gold Rays with Rosette
 Mr. Roy Tadayoshi Asa

Order of the Rising Sun, Gold and Silver Rays
 Mr. Frank Moritsugu
 Ms. Heather Blackwood Newman

Order of the Rising Sun, Silver Rays
 Mr. Soichiro Yamamoto

From the President of the Republic of Kosovo

Presidential Jubilee Medal for the 10th Anniversary of Independence
 Mr. Ross Reid
 Mr. Charles Aaron Rogers

From the President of the Republic of Latvia

Order of the Three Stars, Category 3
 Mrs. Alide Ausma Forstmanis
 Mr. Alain Hausser

Order of the Three Stars, Category 5 
 Ms. Linda Maruta Kronbergs

From the President of the Republic of Lithuania

Medal of the Order of the Cross of Vytis
 Mr. Kostas Rimsa

From the President of the Republic of Poland

Knight’s Cross of the Order of Polonia Restituta

 Mr. Krzysztof Garbowicz

Knight’s Cross of the Order of Merit of the Republic of Poland

 Ms. Malgorzata Karbowska
 Mr. Anthony Muszynski

Cross of Freedom and Solidarity

 Mr. Tomasz Bakalarz
 Mr. Bogdan Idzikowski
 Mr. Andrzej Lozinski

Gold Cross of Merit

 Ms. Maria Bulzacka
 Ms. Sylwia Barbara Krupa
 Ms. Edyta Tobiasz
 Ms. Hanna Wielocha
 Mr. Kazimierz Zarebicki
 Mr. Edward Bukowski
 Mr. Jan Kraska

Silver Cross of Merit

 Mr. Robert Jekosz
 Ms. Dorota Zofia Rajewska

Silver Medal for Long Service

 Mr. Eric Boyd Garland

Long Marital Life Medal

 Mrs. Wieslawa Potocka
 Mr. Zygmunt Wladyslaw Potocki
 Mr. Wladyslaw Chlebek
 Mrs. Zofia Chlebek
 Mrs. Maria Jolanta Manuska
 Mr. Andrzej Manuski

Siberian Exile Cross

 Ms. Genowefa Matkowski
 Mr. Roman Pieczonka
 Mr. Jerzy Steciuk
 Ms. Eleonora Kuczkowska

Medal of the Centenary of Polish Independence

 Mr. Janusz Szepietowski

From His Majesty The King of Spain

Officer’s Cross of the Order of Civil Merit

 Mr. Anthony Aspler

From the President of Ukraine

Cross of Ivan Mazepa

 Mr. Lubomyr Luciuk

From the President of the United States of America

Officer of the Legion of Merit
 

 Colonel Douglas Baird
 Captain Marc Wayne Joseph Batsford
 Brigadier-General Martin Andres Frank
 Brigadier-General Stephen R. Kelsey
 Brigadier-General Roberto G. Mazzolin
 Brigadier-General Brian W. McPherson
 Lieutenant-General J. J. Pierre St-Amand
 Brigadier-General Thomas P. Dunne
 Colonel Kevin F. Bryski
 Colonel Roch Pelletier

Legionnaire of the Legion of Merit 

 Colonel Scott N. Clancy

Defence Meritorious Service Medal

 Colonel Orest M. Babij
 Lieutenant-Colonel Phillip N. Breton
 Colonel Dan Chafai
 Lieutenant-Colonel Derek R. Crabbe
 Lieutenant-Colonel Robert S. Dunn
 Colonel Jean-François Duval
 Major Renee M. M. R. Forcier
 Lieutenant-Colonel Cory A. Gillis
 Lieutenant-Colonel Benjamin Irvine
 Lieutenant-Colonel Scott A. Johnson
 Lieutenant-Colonel Guy Leclerc
 Major Nelson C. Lewis
 Major Timothy P. Lilienthal
 Lieutenant-Commander Ian M. Lynam
 Lieutenant-Colonel Robert J. Lyttle
 Major Michal Mendyka
 Major Christopher G. Miller
 Colonel Alan P. Mulawyshyn
 Lieutenant-Colonel Brian Nekurak
 Major Kevin J. Pruden
 Colonel Joseph S. Shipley
 Colonel John D. V. Vass
 Lieutenant-Colonel Larry Weir
 Colonel Helen Louise Wright
 Lieutenant-Commander Louis C. Haché
 Commander Christopher J. Hargreaves
 Major Nathan Hevenor
 Lieutenant-Commander Ian D. Matheson
 Major Alex Prymack
 Major Sepp J. W. Rodgers
 Major John P. W. Doig
 Major Frederick Keays Levesque
 Lieutenant-Colonel Robert W. Patchett
 Major Michael B. Peters
 Warrant Officer Chad L. Raycraft
 Major Joseph S. Thomson
 Sergeant Gisèle Marie Adams
 Lieutenant(N) Yoon Su An
 Major Christopher Belgum
 Captain(N) Daniel Bouchard
 Captain Derric F. Bowes-Lyon
 Major Véronique Brassard-Lavoie
 Major Mark Anthony Castelli
 Major Christian K. Chriska
 Major Dany Côté
 Major Stéphane Damato
 Major Kevin Davis
 Lieutenant-Colonel David G. Fearon
 Lieutenant-Colonel Ronald J. Fitzgerald
 Major Neil G. George
 Commander Troy D. Gillespie
 Sergeant Geneviève Harnois
 Lieutenant-Colonel James S. Kettles
 Major Alexis Legros
 Commander Roland D. Leyte
 Lieutenant-Colonel Charleen MacCulloch
 Lieutenant(N) Rebecca MacDonald
 Colonel Serge L. Menard
 Sergeant Ladean Morton
 Major Brigitte B. Noel
 Lieutenant-Commander Robert R. Ouellette
 Sergeant Maxime Paquin
 Warrant Officer Michael Pastuck
 Lieutenant-Colonel Michael R. Percy
 Major Stephen Ramey
 Sergeant James W. L. Reid
 Major Shahab Rezaei-Zadeh
 Major Scott K. Roach
 Major Tanya Raylene Robertson
 Lieutenant-Colonel Andrew T. Rule
 Lieutenant-Colonel Alain J. P. Veilleux
 Captain David Von Neppel

Meritorious Service Medal, First Oak Leaf Cluster
 Lieutenant-Colonel Michael Fawcett

Meritorious Service Medal

 Colonel Angela M. Banville
 Major Jonathan Russell Norman Barnes
 Major Christine Theresa Bazarin
 Colonel Jean R. J. Bernier
 Major Tancrède Bérubé
 Captain Matthew D. Boire
 Major Steven M. Card
 Major Kelly Chow
 Superintendent Derek R. Cooke
 Major Jason Czarnecki
 Lieutenant-Colonel Damon J. Dyer
 Lieutenant-Colonel Francis Clifford Egan
 Major Stephane Fortier
 Major John D. Gilchrist
 Major Thomas M. Hammond
 Captain Stephen Irwin
 Captain Ahmad Jaradat
 Major Michelle L. Karasek
 Major Darin M. Kenny
 Major Sylvain F. Lapierre
 Master Warrant Officer Mark Laroche
 Major Curtis E. Penney
 Major Dennis S. Sansom
 Lieutenant-Colonel Jeffrey James Schamehorn
 Lieutenant-Colonel Jean-François Simard
 Major Thomas L. St. Onge
 Major John K. Wade
 Major Jason Edward Zelward
 Major Jameel J. Janjua
 Major Andrew M. Lunn
 Lieutenant-Colonel Kevin H. Tromp
 Major Alexandre Dumulon-Perreault
 Lieutenant-Colonel Dale M. Campbell
 Major Glenn G. Sylvester

Air Medal

 Captain Byron R. Dennis
 Captain Bruce J. Derbyshire
 Sergeant Kimberly L. Fournier
 Captain Matthew R. Galvin
 Master Corporal Daniel V. Mihichuk

First Oak, Third Oak and Fourth Oak Leaf Clusters
 Major David A. McNiff

Erratums of Commonwealth and Foreign Orders, Decorations and Medal awarded to Canadians

Amendments for 26 April 2014

From His Majesty The King of Spain

Officer of the Order of Civil Merit
 Mr. Barry Brown

Amendments for 26 May 2018

From the President of the Republic of France

Knight of the National Order of Merit
 Mr. Yves Tiberghien

National Defence Medal, Gold Echelon
 Colonel Cayle Ian Oberwarth
 Brigadier-General Steven Joseph Russell Whelan

Amendments for 27 October 2018

From the Government of Hungary

Knight’s Cross of the Order of Merit of Hungary (Civil Division)
 Ms. Andrea Blanar
 Mr. Peter Csermely
 Mr. Leslie Lewis Dan
 Mr. Kalman Dreisziger
 Mr. Balazs Jaschko
 Mr. Marton Seregelyes
 Mr. Zoltan Vass

References

See also
 2019 British Birthday Honours
 2019 British Birthday Honours

Monarchy in Canada
2019 awards in Canada